Local elections were held in Baguio on Monday, May 13, 2019, as a part of the 2019 Philippine general election. Voters elected candidates for the local elective posts in the city: the mayor, vice mayor, the congressman, and the twelve councilors

Retired police general Benjamin Magalong won the mayoralty race, beating outgoing vice mayor Edison Bilog, while outgoing mayor Mauricio Domogan lost to incumbent representative Mark Go, marking the first defeat in his political career.

There are a total of 113,899 people who voted out of the 164,125 registered voters.

Mayoral and Vice Mayoral elections

Mayor 
Incumbent mayor Mauricio Domogan is ineligible to run for a fourth term. He ran for the lone congressional seat.

Vice Mayor 
Incumbent vice mayor Edison Bilog is not term-limited but is running for City Mayor.

District representative 
Incumbent Representative Mark Go is running for a second term.

City Council 
The 12 of 14 members of the Baguio City Council are elected at-large via multiple non-transferable vote, where each voter has 12 votes, and can vote up to 12 candidates. The 12 candidates with the highest number of votes are elected.

The other 2 members are elected in indirect elections from the results of barangay elections.Here is a list of candidates.

|-bgcolor=black
|colspan=5|

References 

2019 Philippine local elections
Elections in Benguet
Elections in Baguio